Henry Street is a street in Limerick, Ireland. The street is named after Edmund Henry Pery, 1st Earl of Limerick who had a house on the street which is now occupied by the Hibernian Insurance Company. The street runs parallel to the River Shannon (to the west) and O'Connell Street (to the east).

The street was part of Edmund Sexton Pery's plans for Newtown Pery however much of the street remained undeveloped in comparison to other areas of Limerick at that time. The Bishop of Limerick had his residence on the street. Limerick's old General Post Office is located opposite the former Bishop's Palace. The Franciscan Church is located on the street and is a fine imposing structure near the junction with Bedford Row although it is currently closed. A Presbyterian Church was also located on the street near the junction with Mallow Street although this has been converted into offices.

In recent years Henry Street has seen some investment especially in comparison to other Limerick streets. A lot of new high rise office blocks and apartments have been built along the street. The old illustrious 1000 seater Savoy Theatre that occupied the block between Bedford Row and Shannon Street has been demolished and been replaced by the more modern 5 star Savoy Hotel. Across the road from the Savoy a new modern development in which Dunnes Stores are now located has replaced Spaights.

There is a plaque dedicated to Seán South outside his birthplace on Henry Street.

References

Shopping districts and streets in Ireland
Streets in Limerick (city)